Tricostularia is a genus of flowering plants belonging to the family Cyperaceae.

Its native range is Australia.

Species:
 Tricostularia compressa Nees ex Lehm. 
 Tricostularia neesii Lehm. 
 Tricostularia pauciflora (R.Br.) Benth.

References

Cyperaceae
Cyperaceae genera